Bernt Rainer Wahl is a mathematician, mentor, entrepreneur, and author. He served as CEO of Factle Corporation, Datahunt, and Dynamic Software, and is a former member of the UC Berkeley faculty. He teaches engineering and serves as an Industry Fellow at the Center of Entrepreneurship and Technology and an Executive in Residence at the Skydeck.

In 2002, he was awarded a Fulbright Fellowship to Malaysia.

Wahl was an early pioneer in the fields of chaos and fractal geometry. He authored Exploring Fractals (1994) and co-authored The Fractal Explorer (1991).

His firm Dynamic Software, which he co-founded in 1987 with Peter Van Roy, was an early pioneer in mathematical visualization. The work was showcased in the fashion industry, including work with the designer Jhane Barnes.

In 2001, Bernt Wahl led the management buyout attempt of the search engine company Infoseek through the firm Datahunt. In 2002 he started Factle, a search engine focused on specialized search and local demographics that mapped neighborhoods.

Wahl worked for United Nations on ecotourism and helped the U.S. National Park Service build its first website. He is also involved in social causes, including the work done by The International Justice Mission, and various other organizations’ work on the global dissemination of information.

Notes and references

 "Scholar's Inn"
 U.C. Berkeley Industry Fellow
  Fulbright Directory
 Author: Exploring Fractals
 Author: Mapping the World... One Neighborhood at a Time
 "Lawsuit Claims Mapmaking Firm Owns Your Neighborhood"
 Infoseek
 "Maponics Successfully Concludes Settlement of Its Lawsuit Against Factle"

20th-century American mathematicians
21st-century American mathematicians
Living people
UC Berkeley College of Engineering faculty
Year of birth missing (living people)
Berkeley Macintosh Users Group members